The Mallee heath dragon (Amphibolurus norrisi), is a species of semi-Arboreal Agamidae endemic to Australia. it has also been referenced as Norris’s dragon, Mallee heath lashtail and Mallee heath lashtail dragon.

Taxonomy 
The taxonomic description of the Mallee heath dragon was published by Witten and Coventry in 1984 and was updated by Hoser in 2015. the initial specimen was collected by Coventry and Norris in 1978 and was contained by the Museum of Victoria after its classification in 1984.

Description 
The Mallee heath dragon has a predominantly pale grey body with darker grey stripes extending the flanks and one vertebral stripe extending the body. The vertebral stripe has lateral extensions across the body which sometimes connect to the stipes extending the flanks to the point where the lighter body colour is reduced to smaller blotches. lateral extensions continue onto the tail and gradually become cross bands towards its tip. A dark streak extends from the snout to the ear, above it, a light streak extends from behind the eye across to the ear. Enlarged vertebral, paravertebral and dorsolateral scales, dorsal scales keeled and parallel to vertebral scales. Hindlimb extents to 75% that of the tail, tail extends 200% of the snout, snout measured as 110mm. 

When threatened this species has the ability to engage in fast-paced bipedal running.

Habitat and distribution 
Typical distribution of Mallee heath dragon is within western Victoria and neighboring area of South Australia, extending across coastal regions of the Great Australian Bight and into a small area of Western Australia. They are typically confined to areas of the Mallee and are often found within Mallee heathlands.

Ecology

Diet 
There is little literature specifying diet of the Mallee heath dragon, but following the diets of similar Amphibolurus species, deductions on the general dietary preferences can be made. Small arthropods like grasshoppers, spiders and beetles have been observed preferences in laboratory experiments although it is believed that most small arthropods would be consumed by the Mallee heath dragon.

Response to fire 
Being endemic to a fire prone area, the Mallee heath dragon have evolved to be resistant to fire events. Their semi-arboreal patterns and bipedal running ability allow them to avoid small low-intensity fires, however lower population sizes have been noted after significant fire events.

Conservation 
The Mallee heath dragon is classified as least concern under the IUCN Red List and therefore has no conservation work being conducted on it.

References

External links

Amphibolurus
Agamid lizards of Australia
Taxa named by Geoffrey James Witten
Taxa named by Albert John Coventry
Reptiles described in 1984